The River East Royal Knights are a junior ice hockey team in the Manitoba Major Junior Hockey League. Based in Winnipeg, Manitoba, Canada, the Royal Knights play their home games at Terry Sawchuk Memorial Arena.

History 
Formed in 1972 as the East Kildonan Knights, president and part owner John Haasbeek (who led a group that bought the team in 1977) folded the team in April 1981 after operating it for four seasons. Haasbeek was then approached by Barry Bonni (2017 Manitoba Hockey Hall of Fame inductee) about keeping a team in the area. The two worked together and formed the new River East Royal Knights for the 1981-82 MMJHL season.

After three straight seasons by the E.K. Knights of finishing third in the league standings the Royal Knights captured the Jack McKenzie Trophy in their very first season. The team won four consecutive league titles from 1987 to 1990 and again in 1993 and 2001.

The Royal Knights have been to the league finals twelve times while claiming the Art Moug Trophy (regular season winner) seven times in team history.

Season-by-season

References

External links
 Royal Knights official website
 @MMJHLREKnights

Ice hockey teams in Winnipeg